Madman Entertainment Pty. Ltd., also known as Madman Films, is an Australian distribution and rights management company headquartered in East Melbourne, Victoria, specialising in feature films, documentaries and television series across theatrical and home entertainment formats in Australia and New Zealand.

History

Early history
Madman Entertainment was founded in 1996 by Tim Anderson and Paul Wiegard as a mail order business specialising in imported anime titles, after following the success of Manga Entertainment in the United States and the United Kingdom. Originally selling titles on VHS, the company became the second Australian distributor to author DVDs in-house, with the 1995 film Ghost in the Shell being their first DVD release. In 1998, Madman began airing anime on television, with Neon Genesis Evangelion airing on SBS TV.

Madman  manages the distribution of live-action titles through its labels Madman Films, Directors Suite, Madman Sports, Madman Laughs, Madman Television, Bollywood Masala and Eastern Eye as well as children's entertainment through its Planet Mad and Mad4Kids labels.  Madman also has a theatrical distribution arm called Madman Cinema. In addition, the company distributes programmes acquired or produced by Australia's Special Broadcasting Service (and newly, titles from WWE in Australasia, thus replacing Shock Entertainment) on DVD and Blu-ray.

Until 2005, Madman was the distributor for Umbrella Entertainment.
Umbrella was established in 2001 and is based in Kew, Victoria. It focuses on the genres of horror, cult, arthouse, classics and Ozploitation, as well as restoring and remastering old Australian films.

Acquisition by Funtastic Limited
Madman founders Tim Anderson and Paul Wiegard also signed an employment agreement upon the acquisition, remaining on Madman's board of directors.

In 2007, Madman began a licensing agreement to release original Cartoon Network and Adult Swim series on DVD in Australia and New Zealand. Madman also programmed Adult Swim's anime block in the two countries until Cartoon Network Australia dropped its entire Adult Swim lineup on January 1, 2008.

On 23 February 2008, Madman announced that it had reached a distribution deal with Viz Media to distribute Viz Media's manga titles in Australia and New Zealand. The distribution deal ended in April 2016, with Simon & Schuster taking over distribution of Viz's catalogue, and Madman Entertainment ceasing distribution of all manga titles.

At the 2008 Supanova Pop Culture Expo, Madman announced plans to explore new distribution methods. Madman launched the Madman Screening Room, a video on demand streaming service, with School Rumble being the first title on the platform. Madman also began releasing Blu-ray Disc titles, starting with The Transformers: The Movie in June 2009. On 1 June 2009, Madman Entertainment produced an English adaption of Tamagotchi: The Movie, a 2007 film based on the Tamagotchi digital pets from Bandai and WiZ. Madman also intended to dub the film's sequel, Tamagotchi: Happiest Story in the Universe!, but the dub was cancelled for unknown reasons.

In April 2008, the company announced a collaboration with British company Warp Films. Warp and Madman plan to make "at least two films together over the next three years, starting with Tyrannosaur."

Independent company
On 4 March 2014, Funtastic Limited announced its intention to sell Madman Entertainment due to Madman's market value being half of its carrying value.

In April 2017, Madman Media Group announced it had purchased Garage Entertainment from SurfStitch Group for "a nominal cash consideration", acquiring Garage Entertainment Pty. Ltd. and TMG Media Pty. Ltd., with Madman and SurfStitch agreeing to negotiate a strategic partnership for content development and advertising services.

Changing ownership of Madman Anime Group
On 17 February 2018, Madman co-founder & CEO Tim Anderson confirmed that on 15 November 2017, Sony Music Entertainment Japan subsidiary Aniplex had become a minority shareholder in Madman's anime business, Madman Anime Group, and was issued an undisclosed number of shares.

On 13 February 2020, it was announced that Madman Entertainment, Curzon, and Cinéart partnered to launch a  film development fund for three years. The partnership provides the companies first look options for distribution, and is expected to back 16 projects. The Curzon CM Development Fund is operated from Curzon's London offices, and its first projects include Swimming Home, Sweet Maddie Stone, and The Ballad of a Small Player.

DocPlay
DocPlay is a video-on-demand streaming service dedicated to streaming documentaries. The serviced was launched by Madman Entertainment on 1 December 2016 as a subscription-only service, and included 130 documentary titles, with 20 Australian titles.

On 29 November 2016, it was announced that Madman Entertainment were the recipients of Screen Australia's Enterprise funding program, with Madman launching DocPlay to allow for a revenue-sharing model for filmmakers of documentaries on the platform. The funding also allowed for DocPlay to acquire and stream Australian documentaries on the service.

On 23 July 2019, DocPlay reached a content agreement with ABC Commercial to expand DocPlay's content by adding 180 hours of factual content from ABC's library onto the service. The deal included locally produced content, as well as content from New Zealand and the United Kingdom.

References

External links
 

 
Australian companies established in 1996
Companies based in Melbourne
Entertainment companies established in 1996
2006 mergers and acquisitions
2014 mergers and acquisitions
2017 mergers and acquisitions
Film distributors of Australia
Home video distributors
Home video companies of Australia